The Embassy of Myanmar in London, also referred to as the Embassy of Burma, is the diplomatic mission of Myanmar in the United Kingdom.

Kyaw Zwar Minn had served as Ambassador to the United Kingdom since 5 March 2014, when he presented his Letters of Credence to Queen Elizabeth II. In response to the coup d'état carried out in Myanmar on 1st February 2021, Ambassador Kyaw Zwar Minn publicly demanded, on 8 March, the release of State Counsellor Aung San Suu Kyi and President Win Myint with denying the legitimacy of the junta's rule. On 7 April 2021 Minn was locked out of the Embassy by its pro-junta military attaché.

Gallery

References

External links
Official site

Myanmar
London
Myanmar–United Kingdom relations
Myanmar